José María Urquinaona y Bidot (or Vidot) (1814–1883) was a bishop of Barcelona.  Born in Cádiz, he was presented at the First Vatican Council as secretary of the bishops from Spain.  In 1878, he was made bishop of Barcelona.  The Plaça Urquinaona is named after him.

References

1814 births
1883 deaths
Bishops of Barcelona
People from Cádiz
19th-century Roman Catholic bishops in Spain
Participants in the First Vatican Council